Asparagus cochinchinensis is a species of plant, sometimes called "Chinese asparagus", in the subfamily Asparagoideae of the family Asparagaceae.  No subspecies are listed in the Catalogue of Life.

Range and description 
Asparagus cochinchinensis is distributed in eastern Asia including the Philippines and Japan; named after the southern region of Vietnam, in Vietnamese A. cochinchinensis is called thiên môn đông, the latter similar to tian men dong (天門冬) in Chinese.   
This is a trailing plant, growing up to 2.5 m long; leaves are phyllodes, 15-25 mm long.  The flowers are axillary and the white berries are often in pairs.

The roots and stems are used in traditional Chinese and Korean medicine.

Gallery

References

External links 
 
 

Flora of Indo-China 
cochinchinensis